The Netherlands national long track team is the national long track motorcycle racing team of Netherlands and is controlled by the Dutch Motorsport Union (KNMV). The team was started in all editions of Team Long Track World Championship and they won silver medal twice (2008 and 2009).

Competition

Riders 
Riders who started in Team Long Track World Championship Finals:

 Erik Eijbergen (2007, 2008)
 Dirk Fabriek (2007, 2008, 2009)
 Jannick de Jong (2007, 2008, 2009)
 Theo Pijper (2007, 2009)
 Mark Stiekema (2008, 2009)

See also 
 Netherlands national ice racing team
 Sport in the Netherlands

External links 
 (de) KNMV webside

National long track teams
Long track